Timothy A. Williamson (born 1962) is an American attorney who is also a Democratic party member of the Rhode Island House of Representatives, representing the 38th District from 1993 to 2003 and the 25th district from 2003 to 2011. During the 2009-2010 sessions, he served on the House Committees on Separation of Powers, Judiciary, and Rules. He also served on the Joint Committee on Highway Safety and served as Senior Deputy Majority Leader. Willamson announced in late June 2010 that he would not be seeking reelection.

References

External links
Rhode Island House - Representative Timothy Williamson official RI House website

Democratic Party members of the Rhode Island House of Representatives
Rhode Island lawyers
1962 births
Living people
People from West Warwick, Rhode Island
Creighton University School of Law alumni